The following lists events that happened during 1933 in South Africa.

Incumbents
 Monarch: King George V.
 Governor-General and High Commissioner for Southern Africa: The Earl of Clarendon.
 Prime Minister: James Barry Munnik Hertzog.
 Chief Justice: John Wessels.

Events
May
 29 – The first consignment of 10,000 Afrikaans Bibles arrives at Cape Town from London on the Union-Castle Line's Carnarvon Castle.

Births
 10 March – Allister Sparks, writer, journalist, and political commentator (d. 2016)
 13 March – Solomon Sedibane, sculptor, in Sekhukhuneland in Transvaal.
 29 March – Stanley Mokgoba, president of the Pan Africanist Congress, in Pietersburg.
 11 April – Denis Goldberg, anti-apartheid movement activist, accused No. 3 in the Rivonia Trial (d. 2020)
 28 October – Constand Viljoen, South African military commander, politician & co-founded the Afrikaner Volksfront (Afrikaner People's Front)
 15 December – Donald Woods, journalist and anti-apartheid activist (d. 2001).

Deaths
 13 March – Robert T. A. Innes, astronomer and secretary-accountant at the Cape observatory. (b. 1861)

Sports
 8 July – The first rugby union test match is played between the Wallabies of Australia and the Springboks of South Africa at Newlands.

References

History of South Africa
 
South Africa
South Africa
1930s in South Africa
Years of the 20th century in South Africa